La Vraie-Croix is a commune in the Morbihan department in Brittany in north-western France. Its inhabitants are called Langroëziens after the Breton name for the commune.

Geography
Located in the countryside at the edge of the Lanvaux heathland, La Vraie-Croix is a hilly area with many footpaths which offer attractive views.

History
The name La Vraie-Croix comes from a knight of the Hospitaller Order of St. John of Jerusalem who, returning from a crusade, carried with a fragment of the True Cross. He stopped in the town during this journey. He returned the next day and saw that the fragment had disappeared. The piece was subsequently found in a crow's nest on top of a hawthorn bush.

The townspeople removed it, but the next day the fragment was back in the crow's nest. They saw it was a sign, and the people decided to build a chapel at the site of the tree to house the relic.

Demographics

Sites and monuments
The small village church to this day houses a reliquary which contains a piece of the True Cross.

Green spaces
La Vraie-Croix is renowned for its floral decoration which is organised by the people of the village and which has won numerous awards. Indeed, this county has received a national award several times, as well as a European first prize. For many years the village has achieved a rating of four flowers (the maximum possible) and the grand prize in the Concours des villes et villages fleuris (Cities and villages in bloom competition).

See also
Communes of the Morbihan department

References

External links

 Mayors of Morbihan Association 
 
 Official page of La Vraie-Croix 
 Histoire et Patrimoine 
 Chapelles du Pays Vannetais 
 Photos of chapels in Brittany - Photos de chapelles en Bretagne

Communes of Morbihan